The 2021–22 CAF Confederation Cup qualifying rounds were played from 10 September to 6 February 2022. A total of 51 teams competed in the qualifying rounds to decide the 16 places in the group stage of the 2021–22 CAF Confederation Cup.

Times are in local times.

Draw

The draw for the qualifying rounds was held on 13 August 2021 at the CAF headquarters in Cairo, Egypt.

The entry round of the 51 teams entered into the draw was determined by their performances in the CAF competitions for the previous five seasons (CAF 5-Year Ranking points shown in parentheses).

Format

In the qualifying rounds, each tie was played on a home-and-away two-legged basis. If the aggregate score is tied after the second leg, the away goals rule was be applied, and if still tied, extra time won't be played, and the penalty shoot-out was be used to determine the winner (Regulations III. 13 & 14).

Schedule
The schedule of the competition was as follows.

First round

||colspan="2" rowspan="2" 

||colspan="2" 

|}

US Ben Guerdane won 3–2 on aggregate.

AS FAR won 3–1 on aggregate.

ASAC Concorde won 4–3 on aggregate.

Azam won 4–1 on aggregate.

URA Football Club won 5–2 on aggregate.

Al-Ahli Merowe won 4–0 on aggregate.

Marumo Gallants won 4–2 on aggregate.

0–0 on aggregate. Orapa United won 3–2 on penalties.

CSMD Diables Noirs won 1–0 on aggregate.

Red Arrows won 2–1 on aggregate.

AS Kigali won 8–1 on aggregate.

Binga FC won 5–0 on aggregate.

ASFA Yennenga won 2–1 on aggregate.

Biashara United won 3–0 on aggregate.

CFFA won 2–1 on aggregate.

Interclube won 4–0 on aggregate.

Second round

RS Berkane won 5–0 on aggregate.

JS Kabylie won 3–1 on aggregate.

Enyimba won 4–0 on aggregate.

CS Sfaxien won 4–1 on aggregate.

JS Saoura won 3–2 on aggregate.

Pyramids won 1–0 on aggregate.

Al Masry won 1–0 on aggregate.

Gor Mahia won on walkover after Al-Ahli Merowe withdrew from the second leg in Kenya.

Marumo Gallants won 3–2 on aggregate.

2–2 on aggregate. Coton Sport won on away goals.

Orlando Pirates won 1–0 on aggregate.

Red Arrows won 1–0 on aggregate.

DC Motema Pembe won 4–2 on aggregate.

1–1 on aggregate. Binga FC won 7–6 on penalties.

Al Ahli Tripoli won on walkover after Biashara United failed to appear for the second leg in Libya.

Interclube won on walkover after CFFA withdrew from the second leg in Angola.

Play-off round
The play-off round, also called the additional second preliminary round, includes 32 teams: the 16 winners of the Confederation Cup second round, and the 16 losers of the Champions League second round.

The draw for the play-off round was held on 26 October 2021, 11:00 GMT (13:00 local time, UTC+2), at the CAF headquarters in Cairo, Egypt.

The teams were seeded by their performances in the CAF competitions for the previous five seasons (CAF 5-Year Ranking points shown in parentheses):
Pot A contained the 4 seeded losers of the Champions League first round.
Pot B contained the 4 unseeded winners of the Confederation Cup first round.
Pot C contained the 12 unseeded losers of the Champions League first round.
Pot D contained the 12 seeded winners of the Confederation Cup first round.

Zanaco won 3–2 on aggregate.

Simba won 4–2 on aggregate.

TP Mazembe won 1–0 on aggregate.

ASEC Mimosas won 5–2 on aggregate.

Coton Sport won 2–0 on aggregate.

USGN won 2–1 on aggregate.

AS Otohô won 2–1 on aggregate.

RS Berkane won 2–1 on aggregate.

CS Sfaxien won 1–0 on aggregate.

JS Saoura won 4–2 on aggregate.

2–2 on aggregate. Al Masry won on away goals.

1–1 on aggregate. Al Ahli Tripoli won 4–2 on penalties.

Al Ittihad won on walkover after Enyimba failed to travel to Libya for the first leg.

Pyramids won 2–0 on aggregate.

Orlando Pirates won on walkover after LPRC Oilers withdrew from the second leg in South Africa.

2–2 on aggregate. Royal Leopards won on away goals.

Notes

References

External links
Total CAF Confederation Cup, CAFonline.com

September 2021 sports events in Africa
October 2021 sports events in Africa
November 2021 sports events in Africa
December 2021 sports events in Africa